Imagine: A Socialist Vision for the 21st Century is a book by Alan McCombes and Tommy Sheridan, former high-profile figures in the Scottish Socialist Party. It graphically describes the inequalities of capitalism and shows the need for a socialist alternative, while remaining "free from jargon and dogma". It has been compared to The Global Trap and the work of Swedish author Johan Ehrenberg.

References 

2000 non-fiction books
Books about socialism
Books about politics of the United Kingdom